Navasota haemaphaeella is a species of snout moth in the genus Navasota. It was described by George Hampson in 1918 and is known from the Louisiade Archipelago in Papua New Guinea.

References

Moths described in 1918
Anerastiini